Maliaño is a village in the municipality of Camargo (Cantabria, Spain). The town is located near the Bay of Santander, 5 km from the regional capital. It is the location of the regionally significant Santander Airport. The population in the year 2004 was 7,301 (INE) and it raised to 9,563 inhabitants in 2009. In 2012 9.657 inhabitants.

Maliaño is geographically divided in two parts, the Alto Maliaño (High Maliaño) and Bajo Maliaño (Low Maliaño). Maliaño Alto is the location of the Church of San Juan Bautista, where the sepulchre of the Spanish Renaissance architect, Juan de Herrera, is located.

Notable people 
 Juan Carlos Arteche Gómez (1957-2010), international footballer
 Modesto Cabello Aizpeolea (1922), bolo palma player
 Mateo Escagedo Salmón (1880–1934), historian

References 

Populated places in Cantabria
Localities of Spain